Everhard or Eberhard Jabach (10 July 1618 – 9 March 1695) was a French businessman, art collector and director of the French East India Company. He was born in Cologne in the Holy Roman Empire but later naturalised as a French subject.

Life
His father had expanded the family fortune and founded a bank in Antwerp, then in the Spanish Netherlands. Everhard himself settled in France in 1638 and was naturalised as a French subject in 1647. In 1648 he married Anna Maria de Groote in Cologne – she was a daughter of one of the city's senators and he had four children with her. Francis Haskell called him "an opulent banker", associated with a trading company based in Amsterdam and one of the directors of the French East India Company, managing the 'factory' at Corbeil. In 1671 his fortune was valued at 2 million livres. Now lost, his town house or 'hôtel particulier' was on rue Neuve-Saint-Merri – he put on plays there, whose audiences included Voltaire, before it became the base of the "Caisse Jabach" Comptoir commercial.

Jabach collections 
Jabach is most notable as a famous collector of drawings, paintings, sculptures, objets d'art, bronzes and prints by Raphael, the Caracci brothers, Rubens, Paul Bril, Durer, Le Brun and Poussin. They came from the Ludovisi collection in Italy, from the sales in the Netherlands of the collections of the Earl of Arundel after the death of his widow in 1654, and those in London of Charles I of England in 1650–1653, from other collections in Germany and from the dispersal of Rubens' estate. Some of his drawings originated in Vasari's noted Libro de' Disegni portfolio. In 1661–62 and 1671 he ceded much of his collection to Louis XIV – a total of 5,000 drawings in the second sale, now in the Louvre's Cabinet des dessins.

In 1741 Pierre-Jean Mariette stated that "in selling the King his paintings and drawings, [Jabach] held back some of the drawings, and certainly not the least beautiful ones". At his death he left another collection of 4,000 drawings in 26 portfolios – an inventory of them was made after his death and published in 2002 by the Louvre's département des Arts graphiques.  In 2013 one aspect of Jabach's collection was the subject of an exhibition at the Louvre called "A German at the Court of Louis XIV; From Dürer to Van Dyck: the Everhard Jabach collection of Northern Art".

His portrait was painted by several notable artists of the time, including Rigaud in 1688 and Anthony van Dyck in 1636-37 (now in the Hermitage Museum), whilst he commissioned a group portrait of his family and his collection from Charles LeBrun (since 2014 Metropolitan Museum of Art, a 2nd version having been lost in Berlin in WW2).

He also acted as agent for Cardinal Mazarin in the dispersal in London of the collection of Charles I, in competition with the French ambassador acting for the king.  Most of these paintings also reached the French royal collection after the cardinal's death.  Jabach used agents in London, especially a French merchant called Oudancour. Jabach's purchases totalled over twenty paintings, of extremely high quality, with the representatives of the King of Spain and the Emperor the main other competing buyers.

Selected works from his collection
 Bronzino, Portrait of a Sculptor (now National Gallery, London)
 Caravaggio, The Death of the Virgin (now Louvre)
 Correggio, Allegory of Vice and Allegory of Virtue, from Isabella d'Este's studiolo in Mantua (both now Louvre)
 Durer, the Jabach Altarpiece (main panel lost; side panels in Wallraf-Richartz Museum and Städel Museum)
 van Eyck, Dresden Triptych (now Gemäldegalerie Alte Meister)
 Leonardo, St. John the Baptist (now Louvre)
 Gentileschi, Rest on the Flight into Egypt (now Louvre)
 Titian, The Entombment (now Louvre)
 Titian, Man with a Glove (now Louvre)
 Titian, Conjugal Allegory (now Louvre)
 Titian or Giorgione, Pastoral Concert (now Louvre)

Bibliography

 Brotton, Jerry, The Sale of the Late King's Goods: Charles I and His Art Collection, 2007, Pan Macmillan, 
  Antoine Schnapper, Curieux du Grand Siècle, Flammarion, 1994
 C. Monbeig-Goguel, « Taste and Trade: The Retouched Drawings in the Everhard Jabach Collection at the Louvre », The Burlington Magazine, 1988
  Collections de Louis XIV, Paris, Orangerie des Tuileries, 7 octobre 1977 – 9 janvier 1978, p. 10-20 du catalogue qui reproduit un portrait de Jabach dessiné par Le Brun, et son paraphe
  L'honneur de la curiosité – de Dürer à Poussin, dessins de la seconde collection Jabach, musée du Louvre, février – avril 2002, catalogue
  Philippe Dagen, « De Dürer à Poussin, de merveilleux dessins », Le Monde, 2 février 2002, article non signé ; « Curieux et passionné »,  Le Monde, 22 février 2002
 http://www.metmuseum.org/collection/the-collection-online/search/626692

References 

French bankers
French art collectors
German emigrants to France
Businesspeople from Cologne
1618 births
1695 deaths